Tan Sri Michael Wong Pow Nee (7 October 1911 – 31 August 2002) was a Malaysian politician and diplomat.  He was Penang's first Chief Minister, serving from 1957 to 1969 and Malaysia's first Ambassador to Rome.

Early history
He was born in Bukit Mertajam, Penang, as the son of ethnic Penangite Chinese parents of Hakka descent, namely Cecilia Foo Nguk Yin and John Wong Ee Chin, a hardworking timber merchant cum building developer who both were of the Catholic faith.

He was educated first at the Chinese Jit Sin Primary School then the Anglo-Chinese School and after that at St. Xavier's Institution from which he graduated in 1933.

Instead of pursuing further studies abroad, Wong Pow Nee went to work as a clerk at the Bukit Mertajam Catholic Benevolent Society. In 1935, he took up a clerical position with the Sin Ban Guan Bus Company, but the company folded not long after and Wong Pow Nee embarked on a very different career. Between 1937 and 1943, he taught English at St. Mary's Mission School at Permatang Tinggi. In 1945, he taught English at Kim Sen Primary School in Bukit Mertajam. At the same time he enrolled in a Teachers Training Course from which he graduated in 1947.

Politics and public service
In 1953, he stood for elections in the first Bukit Mertajam Town Council (precusor authority of the Seberang Perai City Council) elections, having reluctantly accepted the nomination of villagers who insisted on being represented by him. He won a seat on the Council under Dr. Lim Chong Eu's Radical Party, formed earlier in 1951. In 1955, together with Dr. Lim Chong Eu, he joined the Malayan Chinese Association following the bad defeat of the Penang Radical Party which was defeated by the newly formed Alliance, and was re-elected to the Council under the Alliance party, after having successfully campaigned against independent candidate, Dr. M. P. L. Yegappan.

In 1957, he was appointed as the first Chief Minister of Penang and delivered the Proclamation of Independence at the Esplanade on 31 August in front of a large crowd, after Tengku Abdul Rahman had done the same simultaneously in Stadium Merdeka, Kuala Lumpur.

He was a member of the Cobbold Commission formed in 1962 that ascertained the views of residents in Sabah (then North Borneo) and Sarawak about joining the Federation of Malaysia preparing the framework for the eventual incorporation of Sabah and Sarawak in 1963. Lord Cobbold headed the Commission. Other members of the Commission assisting him, together with Wong Pow Nee, were Tan Sri Ghazali Shafiee, Sir Anthony Abell and Sir David Watherston. The result of their work was the Cobbold Commission Report 1962. Later, he also read out the proclamation of the formation of Malaysia at the Esplanade (Padang Kota Lama), George Town on 16 September 1963.

In 1969, he failed in his bid to retain the Bukit Mertajam seat and was defeated by the Gerakan candidate, Dato' Ooh Chooi Cheng. 

As a result of the electoral defeat, he suffered a heart attack in December of that year but recovered well enough to continue his service to King and country.

In May 1970, he officially handed over the reins of leadership of the Penang Alliance coalition to Tengku Abdul Rahman.

After relinquishing the position of Chief Minister of Penang, Wong Pow Nee served as Malaysian Ambassador to Italy and the Holy See between 1970 and 1975.

Death
Wong died on the 45th anniversary of Merdeka Day on 31 August 2002 at 6.30am, aged 90. He left behind his wife, Puan Sri Elizabeth Law Siew Kim, seven sons and three daughters. He was accorded a state funeral of the highest honour. Among those who came to pay their last respects were Governor of Penang Tun Abdul Rahman Abbas, Chief Minister Tan Sri Dr. Koh Tsu Koon, Deputy Chief Minister Datuk Dr. Hilmi Yahaya and members of Penang's State Executive Committee.

A memorial was held by Hakka Connextion on Merdeka Day, 31 August 2007. A photo exhibition memorialising the struggles and achievements was hosted from 15 September 2012 by Federation of Hakka Associations of Malaysia at the Penang Hakka Association building in Burmah Road, George Town.

Honours

Honours of Malaya
  :
 Commander of the Order of the Defender of the Realm (PMN) – Tan Sri (1958)
  :
 Recipient of the Malaysian Commemorative Medal (Gold) (PPM) (1965)

References

Sources
 Berita Harian, 20 May 1970, Page 10
 Choong Kwee-Kim (2006) 'A peek into Hakka heritage' in The Star, 16 August 2006 [online] at  accessed on 1 August 2013.
 Chow, Melissa-Darlyne (2012) 'Remembering Tan Sri Wong Pow Nee' in The New Straits Times 11 September 2012 [online] accessed on 1 August 2013.
 Koay Su-Lyn (2013) 'Wong Pow Nee – the first and forgotten CM of Penang' in The Edge [online] at accessed on 1 August 2013.
 Lim Kian-Hock (2010) 'A former civil servant recalls reading out the Malaysia Proclamation' in The Star 16 September 2010 [online] at  accessed on 1 August 2013.
 Ng Su-Ann (2007) Tribute to Wong Pow Nee in The Star 9 August 2007 [online] at accessed mon 1 August 2013.
 Ooi Kee-Beng (2013) 'Dr Lim and the unchanging face of Malaysian politics' in The Malaysian Insider 10 July 2013 [online] at accessed on 1 August 2013.
 Tan, Christopher (2012) 'Memorial hall to celebrate Penang's first CM' in The Star 7 September 2012 [online] at accessed on 1 August 2013.
 The Star 1 September 2007 [online] at accessed on 1 August 2013.
 The Straits Times, 13 May 1970, Page 3
 The Straits Times, 14 May 1970, Page 15
 The Straits Times, 6 September 2002, Page 25
 Utusan Malaysia 1 September 2002 [online] at accessed on 1 August 2013.

1911 births
2002 deaths
Malaysian Roman Catholics
Malaysian people of Hakka descent
People from Xingning
Malaysian people of Chinese descent
People from Penang
Chief Ministers of Penang
Members of the Penang State Legislative Assembly
Malaysian Chinese Association politicians
Malaysian politicians of Chinese descent
Penang state executive councillors
Commanders of the Order of the Defender of the Realm